The 1930 Tour of Flanders was held in 1930.

General classification

Final general classification

References
Résultats sur siteducyclisme.net
Résultats sur cyclebase.nl

External links
 

Tour of Flanders
1930 in road cycling
1930 in Belgian sport